Opisthacanthus rugiceps is a species of African scorpion.

Distribution
Opisthacanthus rugiceps is found in East Africa, and extends further than 15° south only in Malawi.

Systematics
Opisthacanthus rugiceps belongs to the "asper group" in the subgenus Nepabellus of the genus Opisthacanthus in the family Hormuridae.

References

Hormuridae
Animals described in 1897
Arthropods of Africa